Evaldas Šiškevičius (born 30 December 1988) is a Lithuanian former professional road bicycle racer and mountain biker, who competed professionally from 2011 to 2022.

Career
Born in Vilnius, Šiškevičius has competed as a professional since the start of the 2011 season, as the  team he had been a member successfully became a Continental team. Šiškevičius won the Volta ao Alentejo in 2011 – as well as a stage during the event – before winning the Grand Prix de la Somme in September 2012.

At the 2018 Paris–Roubaix, Šiškevičius finished the race over an hour after the winner, Peter Sagan. He arrived so far outside of the time limit that when he arrived at the finish at the velodrome, the gates had already been closed, however, they were opened so that he could complete a ceremonious lap, despite his result still being marked as DNF. However, at the 2019 edition of the race, he managed to finish in 9th place.

Major results

2005
 2nd Time trial, National Junior Road Championships
 3rd Trofee van Vlaanderen Reningelst
2006
 National Mountain Bike Championships
1st  Junior cross-country
2nd Cross-country
 1st Omloop Het Volk Junior
 2nd Overall Sint-Martinusprijs Kontich
 9th Road race, UEC European Junior Road Championships
2007
 National Road Championships
3rd Time trial
3rd Under-23 time trial
 3rd Cross-country, National Mountain Bike Championships
2008
 1st Grand Prix de la ville de Nogent-sur-Oise
 3rd  Time trial, World University Championships
 3rd Time trial, National Road Championships
 10th La Côte Picarde
2009
 2nd Time trial, National Road Championships
 3rd Circuit Méditerranéen
 5th Time trial, UEC European Under-23 Road Championships
2010
 1st  Overall Boucle de l'Artois
1st Stage 1
 2nd Time trial, National Road Championships
2011
 1st  Overall Volta ao Alentejo
1st Stage 3
 National Road Championships
3rd Time trial
5th Road race
 3rd Overall Tour de Bretagne
 8th Jūrmala Grand Prix
2012
 1st Grand Prix de la Somme
 1st Stage 5 Tour de Bretagne
 1st Stage 2 Tour du Limousin
 5th Time trial, National Road Championships
 5th Châteauroux Classic
2013
 3rd Road race, National Road Championships
2014
 9th Grand Prix d'Ouverture La Marseillaise
2015
 1st  Overall Tour of Yancheng Coastal Wetlands
1st  Points classification
1st Stage 1
 1st  Overall Circuit des Ardennes
1st Stage 3 (TTT)
 3rd Overall Tour de Picardie
1st  Points classification
 National Road Championships
4th Time trial
4th Road race
 4th Overall Tour of Taihu Lake
 10th Paris–Camembert
2016
 5th Time trial, National Road Championships
2017
 National Road Championships
4th Time trial
4th Road race
2018
 National Road Championships
3rd Time trial
3rd Road race
2019
 2nd Time trial, National Road Championships
 7th Paris–Bourges
 9th Paris–Roubaix
 9th Grand Prix d'Isbergues
2020 
 1st  Time trial, National Road Championships
2021
 National Road Championships
1st  Time trial
3rd Road race
 5th Overall Baltic Chain Tour
 5th Paris–Troyes
 10th Overall Tour of Estonia
2022
 1st  Overall Tour of Estonia
 National Road Championships
2nd Time trial
5th Road race

References

External links
La Pomme Marseille profile

Lithuanian male cyclists
1988 births
Living people
Sportspeople from Vilnius
European Games competitors for Lithuania
Cyclists at the 2015 European Games
Olympic cyclists of Lithuania
Cyclists at the 2020 Summer Olympics